The administrative-territorial structure of the Tuva Republic in 2008–2011 was regulated by the Law #627 VKh-2, adopted on March 19, 2008. According to the law, the units of the administrative division mirror the municipal divisions of the republic and include the municipal districts, urban okrugs, urban settlements, and rural settlements.

The law also allows the use of alternative terminology to refer to the units of the administrative divisions. The term "municipal district" is used on par with the ethnic term "kozhuun", while the term "rural settlement" is used on par with the ethnic term "sumon".

"Kozhuun" (Russian and ) is the Tuvan term of a historical feudal administrative division known as a banner.  Tuva historically had nine kozhuuns named Tozhu, Salchak, Oyunnar, Khemchik, Khaasuut, Shalyk, Nibazy, Daa-van and Choodu, and Beezi. Each kozhuun was divided into sumu which was then subdivided into arban.  In modern Tuva, the term "arban" is still used to refer to a type of rural locality, which has a population of fewer than 500 inhabitants and no independent budget.

Administrative and municipal divisions

References

Notes

Tuva
Geography of Tuva